Carsten Dethlefsen (born 18 January 1969) is a Danish former professional footballer, who played as a defender for Odense BK. He played a single match for the Danish national team, against England in 1994. He was the male Denmark team's first black player.

Early life
Dethlefsen was born in Hamburg, West Germany to a Liberian father and a German mother. At the age of 1, he was adopted by a Danish couple and raised in Denmark.

Club career
Dethlefsen signed for Odense BK in 1992 and spent six seasons with the club. He played in OB's famous upset of Real Madrid in the 1994–95 UEFA Cup. After playing for Viborg FF in the 1998–99 season, Dethlefsen was forced into retirement by a serious ankle injury.

International career
In March 1994, Dethlefsen made his debut for Denmark, the reigning European Champions, in a 1–0 friendly defeat by England at Wembley Stadium. In the pre-match press conference national team coach Richard Møller Nielsen quipped: "He may be dark, but his football future is bright".

Honours
Danish Cup: 1993

References

External links

Danish national team profile 

1969 births
Living people
Footballers from Hamburg
Danish men's footballers
Denmark international footballers
German footballers
Danish people of Liberian descent
Sportspeople of Liberian descent
Danish people of German descent
German people of Liberian descent
Danish adoptees
German emigrants to Denmark
Association football defenders
Odense Boldklub players
Viborg FF players
Association football fullbacks